Samransak Muangsurin (born 18 June 1959 in Buriram Province) is a retired Thai Muay Thai fighter. He was a two times Lumpinee Stadium Featherweight champion and one of the most feared puncher of the Muay Thai golden era.

Muay Thai career

After beating Smaranthong Kiatbanchong by KO in Lumpinee Stadium on 7 April 1992, Samransak announced his retirement from competition. He since has been working as a Muay Thai trainer in various camps around Thailand and Japan.

Titles and accomplishments

Muay Thai
Lumpinee Stadium
 1986 Lumpinee Stadium 122 lbs Champion
 1988 Lumpinee Stadium 126 lbs Champion
World Free-style Martial Arts
 1982 WFMA 135 lbs Champion

Awards
 1986 Sports Writers Association of Thailand Fight of the Year (vs Saengsakda Kittikasem)

Amateur Boxing
 1982 Thailand Championship Bantamweight 
 1983 Thailand Championship Featherweight 
 1984 Thailand Championship Featherweight

Professional boxing record

Muay Thai record

|-  bgcolor="#c5d2ea"
| 1999-11-26|| Draw||align=left| Hayato Nakabayashi || MAJKF || Tokyo, Japan || Decision  || 5 || 3:00
|-  bgcolor="#cfc"
| 1992-04-07|| Win ||align=left| Samranthong Kiatbanchong ||Lumpinee Stadium || Bangkok, Thailand || KO  || 2 ||
|-  bgcolor="#fbb"
| 1992-02-08|| Loss ||align=left| Coban Lookchaomaesaitong ||Lumpinee Stadium || Bangkok, Thailand || KO  || 2 ||
|-  style="background:#cfc;"
| 1991-11-30|| Win ||align=left| Sinin Phetwihan || Lumpinee Stadium || Bangkok, Thailand || Decision || 5 || 3:00
|-  style="background:#fbb;"
| 1991-11-09|| Loss ||align=left| Boonchai Tor.Thuwanon || Lumpinee Stadium || Bangkok, Thailand || Decision || 5 || 3:00
|-  bgcolor="#cfc"
| 1991-10-12|| Win||align=left| Ronphibun Sitchukiat ||Lumpinee Stadium || Bangkok, Thailand || Decision || 5 || 3:00
|-  style="background:#cfc;"
| 1991-08-24 || Win ||align=left| Sakmongkol Sithchuchok || Lumpinee Stadium || Bangkok, Thailand || KO (Punches) || 2 ||
|-  bgcolor="#fbb"
| 1991-07-20|| Loss  ||align=left| Nuenthong Singkiri ||Lumpinee Stadium || Bangkok, Thailand || Decision|| 5 || 3:00
|-  bgcolor="#fbb"
| 1991-05-31|| Loss ||align=left| Coban Lookchaomaesaitong ||Lumpinee Stadium || Bangkok, Thailand || TKO (Punches)  || 3 ||
|-  bgcolor="#cfc"
| 1991-04-30|| Win||align=left| Khamsanya Tor.Sitthichai ||Lumpinee Stadium || Bangkok, Thailand || KO (Punches) || 3 ||
|-  bgcolor="#cfc"
| 1991-04-05|| Win||align=left| Kaewao Chor.Cheuchart ||Lumpinee Stadium || Bangkok, Thailand || KO (Punches) || 2 ||
|-  bgcolor="#cfc"
| 1991-03-05|| Win ||align=left| Orono Por Muang Ubon ||Lumpinee Stadium || Bangkok, Thailand ||  Decision || 5 || 3:00
|-  bgcolor="#cfc"
| 1991-02-02|| Win||align=left| Kaonar Sor.Kettalingchan ||Lumpinee Stadium || Bangkok, Thailand || Decision || 5 || 3:00
|-  bgcolor="#cfc"
| 1991-01-11|| Win||align=left| Sinin Phetwihan ||Lumpinee Stadium || Bangkok, Thailand || Decision || 5 || 3:00
|-  style="background:#fbb;"
| 1990-12-11|| Loss ||align=left| Sinin Phetwihan || Lumpinee Stadium || Bangkok, Thailand || Decision || 5 || 3:00
|-  style="background:#fbb;"
| 1990-11-09|| Loss ||align=left| Kongtoranee Payakaroon || Lumpinee Stadium || Bangkok, Thailand || Decision || 5 || 3:00
|-  style="background:#c5d2ea;"
| 1990-10-12|| Draw||align=left| Kongtoranee Payakaroon || Lumpinee Stadium || Bangkok, Thailand || Decision || 5 || 3:00
|-  style="background:#cfc;"
| 1990-08-31|| Win||align=left| Yodvittaya Sityodtong|| Lumpinee Stadium || Bangkok, Thailand || KO || 2 ||
|-  style="background:#cfc;"
| 1990-08-07|| Win||align=left| Lampetch Sor.Bodin|| Lumpinee Stadium || Bangkok, Thailand || KO || 1 ||
|-  style="background:#cfc;"
| 1990-06-29|| Win||align=left| Lampetch Sor.Bodin|| Lumpinee Stadium || Bangkok, Thailand || Decision || 5 || 3:00
|-  style="background:#cfc;"
| 1990-05-15|| Win||align=left| Wisanupon Saksamut || Lumpinee Stadium || Bangkok, Thailand || Decision || 5 || 3:00
|-  style="background:#fbb;"
| 1990-03-30 || Loss ||align=left| Roj Lukrangsee || Lumpinee Stadium  || Bangkok, Thailand || Decision  || 5 || 3:00
|-  style="background:#fbb;"
| 1990-02-03 || Loss ||align=left| Dejsak Sakpradu ||   || Thailand || Decision  || 5 || 3:00
|-  style="background:#fbb;"
| 1989-10-20 || Loss ||align=left| Panomrunglek Chor.Sawat || Lumpinee Stadium  || Bangkok, Thailand || Decision  || 5 || 3:00
|-  style="background:#fbb;"
| 1989-08-29 || Loss ||align=left| Pon Narupai || Lumpinee Stadium  || Bangkok, Thailand || Decision  || 5 || 3:00
|-  style="background:#fbb;"
| 1989-07-29 || Loss ||align=left| Therdkiat Sitthepitak ||  || Surin, Thailand || Decision  || 5 || 3:00
|-  style="background:#cfc;"
| 1989-06-24 || Win ||align=left| Therdkiat Sitthepitak || Lumpinee Stadium || Bangkok, Thailand || Decision  || 5 || 3:00
|-  style="background:#fbb;"
| 1989-05-12 || Loss ||align=left| Cherry Sor Wanich || Lumpinee Stadium  || Bangkok, Thailand || Decision  || 5 || 3:00
|-  style="background:#c5d2ea;"
| 1989-04-07 || Draw||align=left| Cherry Sor Wanich || Lumpinee Stadium  || Bangkok, Thailand || Decision  || 5 || 3:00
|-  style="background:#fbb;"
| 1989-03-10 || Loss ||align=left| Detduang Por Pongsawang || Lumpinee Stadium || Bangkok, Thailand || Decision || 5 || 3:00
|-  style="background:#cfc;"
| 1989-01-31 || Win ||align=left| Dokmaipa Por Pongsawang || Lumpinee Stadium || Bangkok, Thailand || Decision  || 5 || 3:00
|-  style="background:#fbb;"
| 1989-01-06 || Loss ||align=left| Wangchannoi Sor Palangchai || Lumpinee Stadium || Bangkok, Thailand || Decision  || 5 || 3:00
|-  style="background:#fbb;"
| 1988-11-25|| Loss ||align=left| Jaroenthong Kiatbanchong || Lumpinee Stadium || Bangkok, Thailand || Decision || 5 || 3:00 
|-
! style=background:white colspan=9 |
|-  style="background:#cfc;"
| 1988-10-11 || Win ||align=left| Jaroenthong Kiatbanchong || Lumpinee Stadium || Bangkok, Thailand || Decision || 5 || 3:00
|-  style="background:#cfc;"
| 1988-08-30 || Win ||align=left| Poonsawat Wor Singsanae || Rajadamnern Stadium || Bangkok, Thailand || KO (Right cross) || 3 ||
|-  style="background:#cfc;"
| 1988-07-18 || Win ||align=left| Poonsawat Wor Singsanae || Rajadamnern Stadium || Bangkok, Thailand || Decision || 5 || 3:00
|-  style="background:#fbb;"
| 1988-06-24 || Loss ||align=left| Samart Payakaroon || Lumpinee Stadium || Bangkok, Thailand || Decision || 5 || 3:00
|-  style="background:#fbb;"
| 1988-05-26 || Loss ||align=left| Samart Payakaroon || Lumpinee Stadium || Bangkok, Thailand || Decision || 5 || 3:00
|-  style="background:#cfc;"
| 1988-04-29 || Win ||align=left| Chanchai Sor Tamarangsri || Lumpinee Stadium || Bangkok, Thailand || Decision || 5 || 3:00  
|-
! style=background:white colspan=9 |
|-  style="background:#fbb;"
| 1988-04-02 || Loss ||align=left| Petchdam Lukborai || WKA Ikki Kajiwara Memorial Show '88 || Tokyo, Japan || Decision || 5 || 3:00
|-
! style=background:white colspan=9 |
|-  style="background:#cfc;"
| 1988-02-02 || Win||align=left| Tuanthong Lukdeja || Lumpinee Stadium || Bangkok, Thailand || Decision || 5 || 3:00
|-  style="background:#cfc;"
| 1987-12-29 || Win||align=left| Sanit Wichitkriangkrai || Lumpinee Stadium || Bangkok, Thailand || Decision || 5 || 3:00
|-  style="background:#c5d2ea;"
| 1987-12-08 || Draw||align=left| Sanit Wichitkriangkrai || Lumpinee Stadium || Bangkok, Thailand || Decision || 5 || 3:00
|-  style="background:#fbb;"
| 1987-10-27 || Loss ||align=left| Paiboon Fairtex || Lumpinee Stadium || Bangkok, Thailand || Decision || 5 || 3:00
|-  style="background:#fbb;"
| 1987-09-22 || Loss ||align=left| Bandon Sit Bangprachan || Lumpinee Stadium || Bangkok, Thailand || Decision || 5 || 3:00
|-  style="background:#fbb;"
| 1987-07-31|| Loss ||align=left| Chamuekpet Hapalang || Lumpinee Stadium || Bangkok, Thailand || Decision || 5 || 3:00
|-  style="background:#fbb;"
| 1987-05-19 || Loss ||align=left| Panomtuanlek Hapalang || Lumpinee Stadium || Bangkok, Thailand || Decision || 5 || 3:00
|-  style="background:#fbb;"
| 1987-03-06 || Loss ||align=left| Panomtuanlek Hapalang || Lumpinee Stadium || Bangkok, Thailand || Decision || 5 || 3:00
|-  style="background:#cfc;"
| 1987-02-06 || Win ||align=left| Yoknoi Fairtex || Lumpinee Stadium || Bangkok, Thailand || KO (Punches) || 4 ||
|-  style="background:#fbb;"
| 1986-12-19|| Loss ||align=left| Saencherng Pinsinchai || Huamark Stadium || Bangkok, Thailand || Decision || 5 || 3:00  
|-
! style=background:white colspan=9 |
|-  style="background:#cfc;"
| 1986-09-09|| Win ||align=left| Saengsakda Kittikasem || Lumpinee Stadium || Bangkok, Thailand || KO (Right cross) || 1 ||
|-  style="background:#fbb;"
| 1986-07-18|| Loss ||align=left| Sanit Wichitkriangkrai || Lumpinee Stadium || Bangkok, Thailand || Decision || 5 || 3:00
|-  style="background:#cfc;"
| 1986-06-13|| Win ||align=left| Saengsakda Kittikasem || Lumpinee Stadium || Bangkok, Thailand || KO || 5 ||  
|-
! style=background:white colspan=9 |
|-  style="background:#fbb;"
| 1986-05-06|| Loss ||align=left| Saengsakda Kittikasem || Lumpinee Stadium || Bangkok, Thailand || KO || 2 ||
|-  style="background:#cfc;"
| 1986-03-27 || Win ||align=left| Chanchai Sor Tamarangsri || Lumpinee Stadium || Bangkok, Thailand || Decision || 5 || 3:00
|-  style="background:#cfc;"
| 1986-02-25|| Win||align=left| Wisanupon Saksamut || Lumpinee Stadium || Bangkok, Thailand || KO || 2 ||
|-  style="background:#fbb;"
| 1985-12-06|| Loss ||align=left| Sanit Wichitkriangkrai || Lumpinee Stadium || Bangkok, Thailand || Decision || 5 || 3:00
|-  style="background:#fbb;"
| 1985-09-03|| Loss ||align=left| Chamuekpet Hapalang || Lumpinee Stadium || Bangkok, Thailand || Decision || 5 || 3:00
|-  style="background:#cfc;"
| 1985-07-26 || Win ||align=left| Chanchai Sor Tamarangsri ||  || Bangkok, Thailand || KO || 1 ||
|-  style="background:#fbb;"
| 1985-06-18 || Loss||align=left| Jomwo Chienggym || Lumpinee Stadium || Bangkok, Thailand || Decision ||5 || 3:00
|-  style="background:#cfc;"
| 1985-04-30 || Win ||align=left| Yoknoi Fairtex ||Lumpinee Stadium  || Bangkok, Thailand || Decision || 5 || 3:00
|-  style="background:#cfc;"
| 1985-04-02 || Win ||align=left| Maewnoi Sitchang|| Lumpinee Stadium  || Bangkok, Thailand || KO || 3 ||
|-  style="background:#cfc;"
| 1985-03-06 || Win ||align=left| Saencherng Pinsinchai||  || Bangkok, Thailand || KO || 2 ||
|-  style="background:#cfc;"
| 1985-02-08 || Win ||align=left| Nikom Phetpothong || Lumpinee Stadium  || Bangkok, Thailand || KO || 3 ||
|-  style="background:#cfc;"
| 1984-12-18|| Win ||align=left| Petchdam Lukborai || Lumpinee Stadium || Bangkok, Thailand || Decision || 5 || 3:00
|-  style="background:#cfc;"
| 1984-11-09 || Win ||align=left| Sonsin Sitneunpayom || Lumpinee Stadium || Bangkok, Thailand || Decision || 5 || 3:00
|-  style="background:#fbb;"
| 1984-09-28 || Loss ||align=left| Sonsin Sitneunpayom || Lumpinee Stadium || Bangkok, Thailand || Decision || 5 || 3:00
|-  style="background:#cfc;"
| 1984-08-31|| Win ||align=left| Pornsaknoi Sitchang || Lumpinee Stadium || Bangkok, Thailand || KO || 3 ||
|-  style="background:#fbb;"
| 1984-07-31|| Loss ||align=left| Kongtoranee Payakaroon || Lumpinee Stadium || Bangkok, Thailand || Decision || 5 || 3:00
|-  style="background:#cfc;"
| 1984-06-29|| Win ||align=left| Manasak Sor Ploenchit ||  || Bangkok, Thailand || KO || 3 ||
|-  style="background:#cfc;"
| 1984-05-08|| Win ||align=left| Singdaeng Kiatadi ||  || Bangkok, Thailand || KO || 3 ||
|-  style="background:#cfc;"
| 1984-04-10|| Win ||align=left| Chamuekpet Hapalang || Lumpinee Stadium || Bangkok, Thailand || KO (Punches) || 2 ||
|-  style="background:#cfc;"
| 1984-03-09|| Win ||align=left| Arthit Majestic || Lumpinee Stadium || Bangkok, Thailand || Decision || 5 || 3:00
|-  style="background:#cfc;"
| 1984-02-24 || Win ||align=left| Nelson Placentia ||  || Los Angeles, United States || KO ||  ||
|-  style="background:#cfc;"
| 1984-02-|| Win ||align=left| Ron Sisner || Lumpinee Stadium || Bangkok, Thailand || KO || 2 || 
|-  style="background:#fbb;"
| 1984-01-24|| Loss ||align=left| Petchdam Lukborai || Lumpinee Stadium  || Bangkok, Thailand || Decision || 5 || 3:00
|-  style="background:#fbb;"
| 1983-12-28|| Loss ||align=left| Phanmongkon Hor.Mahachai || Rajadamnern Stadium || Bangkok, Thailand || Decision || 5 || 3:00
|-  style="background:#fbb;"
| 1983-11-15|| Loss ||align=left| Kongtoranee Payakaroon || Lumpinee Stadium || Bangkok, Thailand || Decision || 5 || 3:00
|-  style="background:#cfc;"
| 1983-10-04 || Win ||align=left| Sonsin Sitneunpayom || Lumpinee Stadium || Bangkok, Thailand || Decision || 5 || 3:00
|-  style="background:#c5d2ea;"
| 1983-08-26|| NC||align=left| Mafuang Weerapol || Lumpinee Stadium || Bangkok, Thailand || referee decision || 5 ||
|-  style="background:#cfc;"
| 1983-07-12|| Win ||align=left| Sonsin Sitneunpayom|| Lumpinee Stadium || Bangkok, Thailand || Decision || 5 || 3:00

|-  style="background:#cfc;"
| 1983-07-12 || Win ||align=left| Sonsin Sitneunpayom || Lumpinee Stadium || Bangkok, Thailand || Decision || 5 || 3:00
|-  style="background:#fbb;"
| 1983-05-10|| Loss ||align=left| Chamuekpet Hapalang || Lumpinee Stadium || Bangkok, Thailand || Decision || 5 || 3:00
|-  style="background:#fbb;"
| 1983-04-05 || Loss||align=left| Samart Payakaroon || Lumpinee Stadium || Bangkok, Thailand || Decision || 5 || 3:00
|-  style="background:#cfc;"
| 1983-02-04|| Win ||align=left| Bangkhlanoi Sor.Thanikul || Lumpinee Stadium || Bangkok, Thailand || TKO || 3 ||
|-  style="background:#cfc;"
| 1982-12-24 || Win||align=left| Jomwo Sakniran || Rajadamnern Stadium || Bangkok, Thailand || KO || 3 ||
|-  style="background:#fbb;"
| 1982-10-15 || Loss ||align=left| Pon Sit Paedang || Lumpinee Stadium  || Bangkok, Thailand || Decision|| 5||3:00
|-  style="background:#cfc;"
| 1982-09-28 || Win ||align=left| Bangkhlanoi Sor.Thanikul || Lumpinee Stadium  || Bangkok, Thailand || KO || 2||
|-  style="background:#fbb;"
| 1982-08-30 || Loss ||align=left| Ronachai Sunkilanongkee || Rajadamnern Stadium  || Bangkok, Thailand || Decision || 5||3:00

|-  style="background:#fbb;"
| 1982-08-02|| Loss||align=left| Jomwo Sakniran || Rajadamnern Stadium || Bangkok, Thailand || Decision || 5 ||3:00  
|-
! style=background:white colspan=9 |

|-  style="background:#fbb;"
| 1982-07-09|| Loss||align=left| Jakrawan Kiatsakdisaktewan || Lumpinee Stadium || Bangkok, Thailand || Decision || 5 || 3:00
|-  style="background:#fbb;"
| 1982-05-27 || Loss||align=left| Bangkhlanoi Sor.Thanikul || Rajadamnern Stadium  || Bangkok, Thailand || Decision || 5|| 3:00
|-  style="background:#cfc;"
| 1982-04-28 || Win||align=left| Masayuki Yamamoto || Rajadamnern Stadium - World Free-style Martial Arts - Chakri Dynasty Bicentenary || Bangkok, Thailand || KO (Punches) || 2||   
|-
! style=background:white colspan=9 |
|-  style="background:#cfc;"
| 1982-04-26 || Win||align=left| Dave || World Free-style Martial Arts || Bangkok, Thailand || KO || 2||
|-  style="background:#cfc;"
| 1982-03-29 || Win ||align=left| Ronachai Sunkilanongkee || Rajadamnern Stadium  || Bangkok, Thailand || Decision || 5|| 3:00
|-  style="background:#cfc;"
| 1982-02-26|| Win||align=left| Mafuang Weerapol || Lumpinee Stadium || Bangkok, Thailand || Decision || 5 || 3:00
|-  style="background:#cfc;"
| 1982-01-11|| Win||align=left| Phanmongkon Hor.Mahachai || Rajadamnern Stadium || Bangkok, Thailand || Decision || 5 || 3:00

|-  style="background:#fbb;"
| 1981-11-26|| Loss ||align=left| Samingnoom Sithiboontham|| Rajadamnern Stadium || Bangkok, Thailand || Decision || 5 ||3:00

|-  style="background:#c5d2ea;"
| 1981-10-13|| Draw||align=left| Kongtoranee Payakaroon || Rajadamnern Stadium || Bangkok, Thailand || Decision || 5 || 3:00
|-  style="background:#cfc;"
| 1981-09-21|| Win||align=left| Kongtoranee Payakaroon || Rajadamnern Stadium || Bangkok, Thailand || Decision || 5 || 3:00
|-  style="background:#cfc;"
| 1981-08-20|| Win||align=left| Bandit Porntawee || Rajadamnern Stadium || Bangkok, Thailand || KO|| 2 ||
|-  style="background:#cfc;"
| 1981-07-08|| Win ||align=left| Samingnoom Tawatchai || Rajadamnern Stadium || Bangkok, Thailand || KO || 3 ||
|-  style="background:#cfc;"
| 1981-05-27|| Win ||align=left| Apirak Singbobae || Rajadamnern Stadium || Bangkok, Thailand || Decision || 5 ||3:00
|-  style="background:#c5d2ea;"
| 1981-02-24|| Draw||align=left| Charanchai Sitwadtep || Lumpinee Stadium || Bangkok, Thailand || Decision ||5  ||3:00
|-  style="background:#cfc;"
| 1981-01-23|| Win ||align=left| Chatchai Pichitsuk || Lumpinee Stadium || Bangkok, Thailand || Decision || 5 ||3:00
|-  style="background:#fbb;"
| 1980-11-07 || Loss||align=left| Lamkong Sitwaiwat || Lumpinee Stadium || Bangkok, Thailand || KO || 4 ||  
|-  style="background:#cfc;"
| 1980-09-29|| Win ||align=left| Petchmongkol Kiattisingnoi ||  || Bangkok, Thailand || Decision || 5 ||3:00

|-  style="background:#cfc;"
| 1980-08-21 || Win||align=left| Fahkaram Lukprabat || || Bangkok, Thailand || Decision || 5 || 3:00

|-  style="background:#cfc;"
| 1980-07-24 || Win ||align=left| Musa Luksuan || || Bangkok, Thailand || KO || 3 ||

|-  style="background:#fbb;"
| 1980-06-19 || Loss ||align=left| Fahkaram Lukprabat || || Bangkok, Thailand || KO || 3 ||

|-  style="background:#cfc;"
| 1980-04-08 || Win ||align=left| Chatchai Panyawut || || Bangkok, Thailand || Referee stopapge || 5 ||

|-  style="background:#fbb;"
| 1980-02-21 || Loss||align=left| Wichalud Jinda || || Bangkok, Thailand || Decision || 5 || 3:00

|-  style="background:#cfc;"
| 1980-01-29 || Win||align=left| Jakrawan Kiattisakthewan || Rajadamnern Stadium || Bangkok, Thailand || Decision || 5 || 3:00

|-  style="background:#cfc;"
| 1980-01-07 || Win||align=left| Wittaya Saksandee || Rajadamnern Stadium || Bangkok, Thailand || Decision || 5 || 3:00

|-  style="background:#cfc;"
| 1979-12-26 || Win ||align=left| Tree Arun Chatyothin ||  || Bangkok, Thailand || Decision || 5 || 3:00

|-  style="background:#cfc;"
| 1979-11-28 || Win ||align=left| Mun Sor Jitpattana ||  || Bangkok, Thailand || Decision || 5 || 3:00

|-  style="background:#cfc;"
| 1979-10-24 || Win ||align=left| Suratnoi Kiatsurat ||  || Bangkok, Thailand || Decision || 5 || 3:00

|-  style="background:#c5d2ea;"
| 1979-09-26 || Draw||align=left| Suratnoi Kiatsurat ||  || Bangkok, Thailand || Decision || 5 || 3:00

|-  style="background:#cfc;"
| 1979-08-22 || Win||align=left| Kukkongnoi Chor.Suthichot ||  || Bangkok, Thailand || KO || 2||

|-  style="background:#cfc;"
| 1979-07-25 || Win||align=left| Harnsuk Phitsanurachan ||  || Bangkok, Thailand || Decision || 5 || 3:00

|-  style="background:#cfc;"
| 1979-04- || Win||align=left| Densiam, Sor Prateep ||  || Prakhon Chai district, Thailand || Decision || 5 || 3:00

|-  style="background:#cfc;"
| 1979-01-24 || Win||align=left| Chumphae Srisompop ||  || Bangkok, Thailand || Decision || 5 || 3:00

|-  style="background:#cfc;"
| 1978-10-21 || Win||align=left| Mongkhonrit Laemfahfah || Rajadamnern Stadium || Bangkok, Thailand || KO (Punches)|| 2 ||  
|-
| colspan=9 | Legend:

References

1959 births
Living people
Samransak Muangsurin
Samransak Muangsurin
Samransak Muangsurin